Guillermo Vilas was the defending champion and won in the final 6–2, 6–2, 6–3 against Jaime Fillol.

Seeds
A champion seed is indicated in bold text while text in italics indicates the round in which that seed was eliminated.

  Guillermo Vilas (champion)
  Jaime Fillol (final)
  Paolo Bertolucci (semifinals)
  Víctor Pecci (quarterfinals)
  Željko Franulović (quarterfinals)
  Mark Cox (second round)
  José Higueras (quarterfinals)
  Ricardo Cano (quarterfinals)

Draw

 NB: The final was the best of 5 sets while all other rounds were the best of 3 sets.

Final

Section 1

Section 2

External links
 1976 South American Championships Singles draw

Singles